Jon Steven Young (born October 11, 1961) is an American former professional football player who was a quarterback in the National Football League (NFL) for 15 seasons, primarily with the San Francisco 49ers. He also played for the Tampa Bay Buccaneers. Prior to his NFL career, he was a member of the Los Angeles Express in the United States Football League (USFL) for two seasons. Young played college football for Brigham Young University (BYU), setting school and NCAA records en route to being runner-up for the 1983 Heisman Trophy.

Young was named the AP's NFL Most Valuable Player in 1992 and 1994, and was the MVP of Super Bowl XXIX where he led the 49ers to a victory over the San Diego Chargers with a record six touchdown passes. During his 1994 MVP campaign, he set a new NFL record for passer rating at 112.8. He is a member of the College Football Hall of Fame and the Pro Football Hall of Fame.

Young was an extremely efficient passer – leading the league in passer rating a record six times, and completion percentage and yards per attempt five times. At the time of his retirement, he had the highest passer rating among NFL quarterbacks with at least 1,500 passing attempts (96.8). As of the end of the 2020 season, he is ranked tenth all time in passer rating, and is ranked third-highest amongst retired players, behind only Drew Brees and Tony Romo. His 43 career rushing touchdowns are second among quarterbacks, while his 4,239 rushing yards ranks fifth all time.

Early years
Born in Salt Lake City, Utah, Young attended Eastern Middle School, and Greenwich High School in Greenwich, Connecticut, where he played quarterback on its Cardinals football team. He earned 1978 All-FCIAC West Division First Team honors in his junior year, his first year as a starter. In his senior year he rushed for 13 touchdowns and earned All-FCIAC West Division First Team honors, and was named to the CIAC All-State team. In the rush-first option offense run by Greenwich he completed only 41 percent of his throws for 1,220 yards, but ran the ball 267 times for 1,928 yards. On Thanksgiving Day in November 1979, Greenwich lost to Darien High School, known for its "Tidal Wave Defense", 17–0. During his senior year, he was co-captain of the football, basketball and baseball teams. In basketball, he averaged 15 points a game. In baseball, he hit .384 and played center field when he wasn't pitching. He was 5–1 and threw a 3–0 no-hitter against New Canaan High School.

College football
Young was heavily recruited by the University of North Carolina. Coach Dick Crum was enamored of Young's running ability, and wanted him to run his option offense. Young instead chose BYU. Initially, he struggled at throwing the ball, and BYU's coaching staff considered switching him to defensive back because of his athleticism. However, he worked hard to improve his passing skills and eventually succeeded record-setting Jim McMahon as BYU's starting QB. Young's senior season (1983) was spectacular. He passed for 3,902 yards and 33 touchdowns in the regular season, and his 71.3% completion percentage set an NCAA single-season record. He also added 544 yards rushing. With Young at quarterback, BYU set an NCAA record by averaging 584.2 yards of total offense per game, with 370.5 of those yards coming from Young's passing and rushing. The Cougars finished the year with an impressive 11–1 record; Young was named a unanimous All-American and received the Davey O'Brien National Quarterback Award, which recognizes the nation's best collegiate quarterback each year. He also finished second in voting for the Heisman Trophy, behind Nebraska running back Mike Rozier. Young capped his college career by scoring the game-winning touchdown on a pass from the halfback in BYU's 21–17 victory over Missouri in the 1983 Holiday Bowl.

Young finished his college career with 592 pass completions for 7,733 yards and 56 touchdowns, along with 1,048 yards and 18 touchdowns rushing. He was enshrined in the College Football Hall of Fame in 2001.

Professional football

USFL

Los Angeles Express
Young was selected by the Los Angeles Express in the first round (11th overall) of the 1984 USFL Draft. He signed a record ten-year, $40 million contract with the Express in  He agreed to take his payment in the form of an annuity paid out over forty years to help the fledgling team.

It was taken for granted that Young would be the first pick in the 1984 NFL Draft, and that he would be selected by the Cincinnati Bengals, who were three years removed from the Super Bowl and had landed the No. 1 pick in a trade with the then-moribund Tampa Bay Buccaneers. However, the Bengals still had Ken Anderson as their quarterback and planned to have Young sit behind Anderson for the 1984 season before possibly taking over in 1985. Young found that prospect unappealing, which opened the door for the Express. Express general manager Don Klosterman told Young that if he signed with the Express, his head coach would be John Hadl, a former All-Pro quarterback who had shepherded John Elway through his first year in the NFL. Klosterman also told Young that Hall of Fame coach Sid Gillman, who had been hired as a consultant, would tutor him on how to be a pro quarterback. Young was convinced, and signed with the Express.

At the time, it was another huge signing by the fledgling league, which had already succeeded in signing both the reigning Heisman Trophy winner, running back Mike Rozier of Nebraska; and the previous winner, Georgia running back Herschel Walker. After missing the first six games of his rookie season while taking some college classes in order to graduate on time, Young started the final twelve. He had a respectable year, highlighted by becoming the first pro football player ever to pass for 300 yards and rush for 100 in a single game. 

Despite a roster which included such future NFL players as Jojo Townsell, Mel Gray, and Kevin Nelson, and making the Western Conference title game in Young's first season, the Express were never able to create a sustaining fan base in Los Angeles. They often played to sparse crowds that looked even more so in the 95,000-seat Los Angeles Memorial Coliseum.

Late in the season, The New York Times published an investigation of owner J. William Oldenburg's finances that suggested Oldenburg was not as well off as he claimed. The FBI had been investigating Oldenburg since the middle of the season. A week after the Times article, Oldenburg stopped paying the Express' bills, forcing the league to draw on the team's emergency line of credit to keep it going through the playoffs. Houston Gamblers minority partner Jay Roulier stepped in to buy the team, only to be pushed out when it emerged that he too had misrepresented his net worth. The league took control of the team and cut expenditures to the bare minimum. The other teams made contributions to keep the Express going through the season – enough to meet payroll, but not much else.

Under the circumstances, the 1985 season rapidly became a fiasco. Despite fielding essentially the same team as a year prior, the Express cratered to a 3-15 record. Even before a rash of injuries decimated the roster, Young and the other young players concluded that the Express would not be around for the planned move to a fall schedule in 1986. With this in mind, they played tentatively so as not to harm their NFL prospects. 

Before the Express' final home game – which had been moved to Los Angeles Pierce College in the San Fernando Valley – the bus driver refused to leave unless he was paid up front in cash. Young contributed some money, as did the team trainer, and the driver took them to the game. In the season finale at Orlando, Young had to line up at tailback because a rash of injuries had left the Express without any healthy running backs. The owners had refused to allocate any money to allow the Express to replace injured players.

It was reported that Young had insured the contract and would still be paid until 2027. However, a 1985 Los Angeles Times article stated that he received a $1.4 million settlement on the annuity.

The league ceased operations in 1986 after losing most of its claims in an antitrust suit against the NFL, with its top talent absorbed by the NFL in a dispersal draft conducted in the aftermath.

NFL

Tampa Bay Buccaneers
Young grew increasingly dissatisfied with the disarray surrounding the Express. Just a week before what proved to be the last USFL title game, Young gave the USFL an ultimatum – find a new owner for the Express, or allow him to buy out his contract and go to the NFL. Soon after the league decided to suspend the Express's operations for the 1986 season, Young bought out his Express contract and signed with the Tampa Bay Buccaneers, who had made him the first pick in a supplemental draft of USFL and CFL players a year earlier.

By this time, the Bucs were in the midst of what would be 12 consecutive 10-loss seasons. They posted identical 2–14 records in Young's two seasons with them, going 3–16 with him as a starter. Young threw for only 11 touchdowns with 21 interceptions while completing fewer than 55% of his passes.

San Francisco 49ers
The Buccaneers selected University of Miami quarterback Vinny Testaverde first overall in the 1987 NFL Draft because Young was deemed a bust. Young was traded to the San Francisco 49ers on April 24, 1987, to serve as a backup to Joe Montana. 49ers coach Bill Walsh was impressed by Young's natural abilities, and believed his lackluster numbers were primarily due to the lack of talent around him in Tampa Bay.

The Buccaneers received second and fourth round draft picks in the trade, which they used to draft Miami linebacker Winston Moss, and Arizona State wide receiver Bruce Hill, respectively.

Montana's backup: 1987–1990

Young played behind Montana for four years, but shone as a backup. Substituting for an injured Montana, early in the first quarter of a 1987 game against the Chicago Bears, he threw four touchdown passes in a 41–0 victory. In their 1987 divisional playoff game against the Minnesota Vikings, he replaced Montana in the second half after the team fell behind 27–10. The 49ers still lost the game, but Young had a good performance, completing 12 of 17 pass attempts for 158 yards and a touchdown, with one interception, while also leading San Francisco in rushing with 72 yards and a touchdown on six carries. On October 30, 1988, Young ran for a 49-yard, game-winning touchdown against the Vikings. He started the game out with a 73-yard touchdown pass to John Taylor, after Montana went down with an injury. The play earned the 49ers a 24–21 victory and a bit of revenge on the Vikings for their previous season's playoff loss. The win turned out to be crucial, as without it the 49ers would have finished the season 9–7 and missed the playoffs, as two other teams in their division, the Los Angeles Rams and New Orleans Saints, had 10–6 records. Instead, the 49ers won their division, earned the #2 playoff seed, and went on to win the Super Bowl.

In 1989, he displayed potential to become the team's starter in the future. While Montana won the NFL MVP award and led the team to victory in Super Bowl XXIV, Young still had a good season, completing 69% of his passes for 1,001 yards and eight touchdowns, with only three interceptions. On October 22, 1989, he posted a perfect passer rating of 158.3 when he completed 11 of 12 passes for 188 yards and three touchdown passes in a 37–20 victory over the New England Patriots.

He rushed for a career-high 102 yards on just eight carries against the New Orleans Saints on December 23, 1990, making him only the second 49ers quarterback to rush for at least 100 yards in a single game. The 49ers lost the game 13–10.

In his four seasons as a backup, Young threw 23 touchdown passes and only six interceptions.

1991 season
Following an injury to Montana's elbow in the 1990 NFC Championship Game, which forced him to miss the entire 1991 season, Young got his chance to lead the 49ers. He got off to a rough start. Midway through the season, the 49ers found themselves struggling with a 4–4 record. In the ninth game of the season, after throwing a franchise-record 97-yard touchdown pass to Taylor, Young suffered a knee injury and was replaced by backup quarterback Steve Bono. After a loss in that game and the next, Bono led the 49ers to five consecutive victories, playing so well that coach George Seifert decided to keep him in the starting lineup after Young had recovered. It wasn't until late in the 15th game of the season, after Bono went down with an injury of his own, that Young got to play again. Young then closed out the season by throwing for 338 yards and three touchdowns and also rushing for 63 yards and another touchdown in a 52–14 win over the Chicago Bears in a Monday Night Football game at Candlestick Park.

Young finished the season with an NFL best 101.8 passer rating. Despite missing five full games and most of a sixth, he still threw for 2,517 yards and 17 touchdowns with only 8 interceptions. But despite Young's strong season, the season for the team was widely regarded as a disappointment. The 49ers had slipped from a 14–2 record in the previous season to a 10–6 record in 1991. While 10 wins is usually enough to make the playoffs, this time it was not, and San Francisco ended up not playing in the postseason for the first time since 1982. It was thought by many that Young's days as the 49ers starter were numbered due to the impending return of Montana from the injury to his right elbow, and some observers said the 49ers should trade Young and keep Montana and Bono. However, the trade never happened.

1992 season: first MVP

By the start of the 1992 season, it appeared that Young's starting job was in serious peril. In addition to having to compete with Bono, Montana appeared to be close to recovering from his elbow tendon surgery. San Francisco came close to trading Young to the Los Angeles Raiders, but no deal was finalized and it turned out that Montana would not recover in time to start in the opening game. Montana would not return until the final game of the 1992 season, a Monday Night home game against the Detroit Lions. Montana played the entire second half of that final game and guided the 49ers to victory.

Young ended up as San Francisco's starting quarterback, but once again got off to a rough start. On the fifth play of the opening game at the Giants, he suffered a concussion and was replaced by Bono, who threw two touchdown passes while leading the 49ers to a 31–14 win. The following week, San Francisco lost 34–31 to the Buffalo Bills, despite a career-high 449 passing yards and three touchdowns from Young, in a game that for the first time in NFL history had zero punts from either team.

Young recovered and led the 49ers on a five-game winning streak, capped off by a 56–17 win over the Atlanta Falcons in which Young passed for 399 yards and three touchdowns. After missing most of the next game (a 24–14 loss to the Cardinals) with the flu, he led San Francisco to victory in all of their remaining games of the season, giving the team a 14–2 record. He went on to throw for 227 yards and 2 touchdowns, and rush for 73 yards, in a 20–13 divisional playoff win over the Washington Redskins. The 49ers lost the NFC title game, however, 30–20 against the eventual Super Bowl champion Dallas Cowboys. Young threw for 313 yards, completing 71.4% of his passes while passing for one touchdown and rushing for another. He also threw two interceptions, but the final one came with the outcome of the game already decided.

Young finished the season with 3,465 passing yards and 537 rushing yards, along with an NFL-best 25 touchdown passes and 107.0 passer rating, earning him the NFL Most Valuable Player Award and his first selection to the Pro Bowl. He was the first quarterback ever to record a triple-digit rating in consecutive seasons. Many credit Young's turnaround to the mentoring of the 49ers' new offensive coordinator Mike Shanahan, who worked with Young on combining his running skill with on-the-move passing decisions.

1993 season
Before the start of the 1993 season, team owner Eddie DeBartolo Jr. announced that he wanted Montana to resume his role as starting quarterback for the 49ers. However, a rift in the locker room had developed, with players split on whom they wanted at quarterback. In the spring of 1993, at Montana's request, San Francisco traded Montana to the Kansas City Chiefs. Young was now the 49ers' undisputed starter, and would remain so for the rest of his career. But once again, he had a rough start to the season. Over the first four games of 1993, Young, who was hindered by a swollen thumb on his throwing hand, threw eight interceptions, more than he had thrown during the entire 1992 season. But after his thumb healed, Young went on an incredible streak over a span of seven games, throwing 16 touchdown passes with only 2 interceptions and a 122.2 passer rating. By the end of the year, Young set franchise records for most passing yards (4,023), and consecutive passes thrown without an interception (189), (later eclipsed by Alex Smith in 2012) while leading the NFL in touchdown passes (29) and passer rating (101.5). The team slipped to a 10–6 record, but advanced to the NFC championship game again by blowing out the New York Giants 44–3 in the divisional round. However, once again they were defeated by the Dallas Cowboys, this time 38–21.

1994 season: second MVP and Super Bowl run
After several key free agent signings (including All-Pro cornerback Deion Sanders) and NFL Draft selections, the 49ers looked to win their first Super Bowl since 1989. They started fast, beating the Los Angeles Raiders 44–14 on the strength of four touchdown passes from Young, one of four games during the regular season in which he had at least four. After a loss in a much-anticipated game to Joe Montana and the Kansas City Chiefs, the 49ers won their next two games before losing to the Philadelphia Eagles 40–8 at Candlestick Park, a game in which Young was eventually benched in the middle of an offensive series. Although head coach George Seifert later said he only pulled Young because he was getting manhandled by the Eagles' defense, Young had had enough of being scapegoated for 49er shortfalls and loudly (and visibly) lambasted Seifert over his decision while standing on the sideline during the game. 

But the game was considered a turning point in the season; from there, Young led the team to 10 consecutive wins, by an average of 20 points, before losing the meaningless finale against the Vikings in which Young completed his first 12 of 13 attempts before going to the sidelines. They finished an NFL best 13–3, securing home-field advantage throughout the NFC playoffs. The 49ers had the number-one offense in the NFL, and were so dominant that Seifert often took Young out of games early if he felt that the 49ers had an insurmountable lead at the time.

After an easy 44–15 victory over the Chicago Bears in the divisional round of the playoffs, the 49ers jumped out to a 31–14 halftime lead over the Dallas Cowboys in the NFC Championship Game, holding on to win 38–28. Young threw for two touchdowns, while adding 47 yards and another touchdown on the ground. As a result, he went to his first Super Bowl as a starting quarterback. The 49ers were heavy favorites to become the first team with five Super Bowl victories.

On the strength of a six-touchdown performance that surpassed the previous Super Bowl record of five, owned by the man Young replaced, Joe Montana, Steve Young was named the MVP of Super Bowl XXIX, as the 49ers defeated the San Diego Chargers, 49–26. Young also threw for 325 yards and rushed for 49 yards, making him the first player ever to finish a Super Bowl as the game's leader in both rushing and passing yards.

The victory capped off an incredible year for Young, who had one of the best seasons by a quarterback in NFL history. He threw for 3,969 yards, a then-franchise record 35 touchdown passes with only 10 interceptions, completed 70.3 percent of his passes – the highest completion percentage of the 1990s, third all-time, and at the time, the best completion percentage by any quarterback with more than 400 attempts (later eclipsed by Drew Brees in 2009). Additionally, Young broke Joe Montana's single-season mark with a then-record 112.8 passer rating, and also once again demonstrated his great scrambling ability, accumulating another 289 yards and 7 touchdowns on the ground. For his record-breaking season performances, Young was awarded his second AP NFL MVP award, becoming the 7th player in NFL history to win both league and Super Bowl MVP honors in the same season.

Later years and injuries
In the three years following Super Bowl XXIX, the 49ers would be eliminated each year by Brett Favre and the Green Bay Packers, twice in San Francisco. In addition to the early playoff exits, Young suffered a series of injuries that forced him to miss several games from 1995 to 1997. Young entered the 1998 season at age 37 and some began to wonder if his skills would diminish because of his history of injuries and a general decline in his game due to age. However, he silenced all critics once again, putting up career numbers in passing yards (4,170) and passing touchdowns (36). The 49ers finally beat Favre and the Packers in an NFC wild card game that year, as Young threw the winning touchdown to wide receiver Terrell Owens with three seconds remaining to win the game 30–27. In reference to Dwight Clark's legendary catch against the Dallas Cowboys in the 1981 NFC championship game, Owens's grab was called "The Catch II". A week later, however, Garrison Hearst broke his ankle on the 49ers' first play from scrimmage. Without the threat of a running game, Young threw three interceptions (the last one a Hail Mary pass with under 30 seconds remaining in the game) and the 49ers were defeated by the Atlanta Falcons 20–18. Over that span of seasons from 1995 to 1998, Young led the NFL in passer rating twice (in 1996 and 1997), and led the NFL with 36 touchdown passes in 1998.

The 1999 season would turn out to be Young's last in the NFL. Young was plagued by concussions throughout his career. During a Week 3 Monday Night Football game against the Arizona Cardinals, Young was violently sacked by Cardinals cornerback Aeneas Williams on a blitz. Running back Lawrence Phillips was supposed to pick up Williams, but missed. Young was knocked out of the game with a concussion, and didn't return again for the rest of the season due to symptoms of post-concussion syndrome. The concussion he suffered against the Cardinals was reportedly his second in a season that was only three weeks old, and the seventh (at least) of his career. Following the season, the 49ers told him that he would be released if he did not retire. Although Young was offered a job as the starting quarterback of the Denver Broncos (where his former offensive coordinator, Mike Shanahan, was the head coach), he retired because of his repeated concussions. In a 2013 Frontline interview, Young said that, partially based upon their own experiences, he and many retired players are increasingly concerned about repeated concussions and subconcussive hits. He is particularly concerned about certain positions that take frequent hits, such as running backs and linemen.

Career statistics and records

USFL career

NFL career

Records and legacy

Although Young did not become the 49ers' starter until his 8th NFL season, and he played a full season only three times (all consecutively) during his 15-year career, Young had a significant impact on the NFL. A two-time league MVP, he completed 2,667 of 4,149 passes for 33,124 yards and 232 touchdowns, with 107 interceptions, and 43 rushing touchdowns. His 96.8 career passer rating is the sixth highest in NFL history and second highest among retired players, behind Tony Romo; his 4,239 rushing yards are the fourth most ever gained by a quarterback, behind Michael Vick, Cam Newton, and Randall Cunningham. He was the NFL's top rated passer in six different seasons and led the league in touchdown passes four times. In 20 postseason games, he threw 20 touchdown passes with only 13 interceptions, and scored 8 touchdowns on the ground. In his stint with the San Francisco 49ers, Young passed for 29,907 yards, 221 touchdowns, and 86 interceptions, with a passer rating of 101.4, highest in franchise history. He was also sacked 290 times, also most in franchise history.

NFL records
Tenth highest passer rating, career, including active players – 96.8
Fourth highest passer rating, career, retired players only – 96.8
Eighth highest career completion percentage, retired players – 64.3%
Most times led the league in passer rating, career – 6 (tied with Sammy Baugh)
Most consecutive times led the league in passer rating – 4 (1991–94)
One of seven QBs to lead the league in touchdown passes 4 times (tied w/ Johnny Unitas, Brett Favre, Peyton Manning, Tom Brady, Drew Brees, and Len Dawson)
Most TD passes, playoff game – 6 (tied w/ Daryle Lamonica & Tom Brady)
Most TD passes in one Super Bowl – 6
Most rushing yards by a QB, postseason career – 594
Most rushing touchdowns by a QB, postseason career – 8

49ers records
 Highest completion percentage (20+ Atts) (Game): vs Detroit (10/20/91), 90.0
 Most average yards per attempt (20+ Atts) (Game): vs Detroit (12/19/93), 15.39
 Most touchdown passes (season): 36 (1998)
 Best completion percentage (season): 70.3 (1994)
 Best passer rating (season): 112.8 (1994)
 Most 300-yard passing games (season): 7 (1998)
 Best passer rating (career): 101.4 
 Most consecutive games with a touchdown pass: 18, at Det. (10/9/94) to vs. StL (11/26/95) note: (DNP in 5 games in 1995)
 Most rushing touchdowns by a quarterback (career): 43

In 1999, he was ranked No. 63 on The Sporting News list of the 100 Greatest Football Players. Young was elected to the Pro Football Hall of Fame on February 5, 2005; he was the first left-handed quarterback to be so honored. He was enshrined August 7, 2005. His induction speech was given by his father, LeGrande "Grit" Young.

The San Francisco 49ers had his No. 8 jersey retired during a halftime ceremony against the New England Patriots on October 5, 2008. He was the 11th player in team history to receive this honor. He is also the only 49er in team history to wear No. 8.

Awards and honors

NFL
 3× Super Bowl champion (XXIII, XXIV, XXIX)
 Super Bowl MVP (XXIX)
 2× NFL Most Valuable Player (1992, 1994)
 NFL Offensive Player of the Year (1992)
 2× UPI NFC Offensive Player of the Year (1992, 1994)
 3× First-team All-Pro (1992–1994)
 3× Second-team All-Pro (1995, 1997, 1998)
 7× Pro Bowl (1992–1998)
 4× NFL passing touchdowns leader (1992–1994, 1998)
 6× NFL passer rating leader (1991–1994, 1996, 1997)
 5× NFL completion percentage leader (1992, 1994–1997)
 2× Bert Bell Award (1992, 1994)
 San Francisco 49ers Hall of Fame
 San Francisco 49ers No. 8 retired
 Pro Football Hall of Fame inductee (2005)

College
 Davey O'Brien Award (1983)
 Unanimous All-American (1983)
 Sammy Baugh Trophy (1982)
 2× WAC Offensive Player of the Year (1982, 1983)
 2× First-team All-WAC (1982, 1983)
 BYU Cougars Jersey No. 8 retired
 College Football Hall of Fame inductee (2001)

Post-football

Business career

In 1994, Young received a Juris Doctor (J.D.) from BYU's J. Reuben Clark Law School.

In 2000, Young gave the opening prayer at the Republican National Convention.

In 2007, Young co-founded Huntsman Gay Global Capital (HGGC), with billionaire industrialist Jon M. Huntsman and former Bain Capital executive Robert C. Gay. After being involved in business ventures with the private equity firm, he has continued to serve as a managing director.

In 2011, Young was one of several notable BYU athletes and coaches who appeared in the school's "Real Cougar" advertising campaign, which featured the individuals telling an actual cougar about being a "real cougar". In one of the ads, Young poked fun at himself:
Young: I love BYU so much I even got my law degree here.
Cougar: (growls)
Young: Lawyers... I know.
As of 2022 Young was serving as Chairman of the Board for Integrity Marketing Group and his private equity firm, Huntsman Gay Global Capital, held a position in the partnership.

Acting career
Young has both performed dramatic roles and appeared as himself in a limited acting career. He appeared in one episode of Frasier and one episode of Lois & Clark: The New Adventures of Superman (cast as Lois' former high school football quarterback boyfriend, Joe Maloy). He also made a guest appearance as himself in the Dharma & Greg episode "Are You Ready for Some Football?" encouraging Dharma, the team's Number One Fan. In 1995, Young appeared as himself in the Season 6, Episode 12 episode of Beverly Hills, 90210. He also made cameo appearances in the LDS comedy The Singles Ward (2002) and in a season 5 episode of BYUtv's Studio C (2014). Young also made a guest appearance as himself in season 8 of the NBC comedy series Wings in the episode "Just Call Me Angel".

Young was originally offered a part in the 1998 movie There's Something About Mary, but turned the role down. He was replaced by Brett Favre.

Philanthropy

Young serves as a National Advisor to ASCEND: A Humanitarian Alliance. This non-profit organization plans expeditions to African and South American countries to provide life skills mentoring with sustainable solutions in education, enterprise, health and simple technology.

In 1993, Young founded a charitable foundation known as the Forever Young Foundation, which serves children facing significant physical, emotional, and financial challenges by providing academic, athletic, and therapeutic opportunities otherwise unavailable to them.

Young also serves as the national spokesman for an organization founded by former Save Darfur Coalition executive director and founder, David Rubenstein. He began his affiliation with the organization in 2009, when he became the honorary league commissioner for their charitable dodgeball tournaments held on college campuses nationwide.

Personal life
Young is a great-great-great-grandson of Brigham Young, second president of the Church of Jesus Christ of Latter-day Saints, for whom BYU is named.

Young has been married to Barbara Graham since 2000. They have two sons and two daughters. According to A Football Life, as his playing career ended before his eldest child was born, he wrote his autobiography QB: My Life Behind the Spiral initially as a private memoir for his children.

See also
 Bay Area Sports Hall of Fame
 List of NCAA major college football yearly passing leaders
 List of NCAA major college football yearly total offense leaders
 List of NFL quarterbacks who have posted a perfect passer rating

References

External links

 
 
 
 

1961 births
All-American college football players
American color commentators
American football quarterbacks
American male television actors
American philanthropists
Brigham Young University alumni
BYU Cougars football players
College Football Hall of Fame inductees
Greenwich High School alumni
J. Reuben Clark Law School alumni
Latter Day Saints from California
Latter Day Saints from Connecticut
Latter Day Saints from Utah
Living people
Los Angeles Express players
National Conference Pro Bowl players
National Football League Most Valuable Player Award winners
National Football League Offensive Player of the Year Award winners
National Football League players with retired numbers
People from Riverside, Connecticut
Players of American football from Connecticut
Players of American football from Salt Lake City
Pro Football Hall of Fame inductees
Richards–Young family
San Francisco 49ers players
Sportspeople from Greenwich, Connecticut
Super Bowl MVPs
Tampa Bay Buccaneers players
Utah Republicans